More of the Monkees is the second studio album by the American pop rock band the Monkees. It was recorded in late 1966 and released on Colgems label #102 on January 9, 1967. It displaced the band's own debut album from the top of the  Billboard 200 chart and remained at No.1 for 18 weeks—the longest of any Monkees album. Combined, the first two Monkees albums were at the top of the Billboard chart for 31 consecutive weeks. More of the Monkees also went to No.1 in the UK. In the U.S. it has been certified quintuple platinum by the RIAA with sales of more than five million copies.  More of the Monkees is also notable for being the first pop/rock album to be the best-selling album of the year in the U.S.

History
Monkee-mania had reached full swing by the time the album was released. The Monkees' second single, "I'm a Believer"—included on this album—held the number one position on the Billboard Hot 100 and they were about to embark on a highly successful concert tour.

The release of More of the Monkees was rushed to capitalize on the band's popularity, catching even its members by surprise. The band learned of the album's existence while on tour in Cleveland, Ohio, surprised it had been released without their knowing. They were dismayed by the cover image of them (which was used in an advertisement for JCPenney) and were offended by production overseer Don Kirshner's liner notes, which praised his team of songwriters before mentioning, almost as an afterthought, the names of the Monkees. The band, particularly Nesmith, was also furious about the songs—selected for the record from 34 that had been recorded—leading Nesmith to later tell Melody Maker magazine that More of the Monkees was "probably the worst album in the history of the world".

The group began to grow concerned over their musical output, since this album and their debut, The Monkees, featured them limited to just vocals with scattered instrumental contributions. Kirshner had a strict rule that the Monkees were to provide only vocals on his productions, although separate sessions produced by Michael Nesmith himself usually featured Peter Tork on guitar.  More of the Monkees has Nesmith limited to one song as lead vocalist.

Within weeks of the release of More of the Monkees, Nesmith lobbied successfully with the group's creators, Bob Rafelson and Bert Schneider, for the Monkees to be allowed to play their instruments on future records, effectively giving the quartet artistic control. To make his point clear to Kirshner, who was balking at the idea, Nesmith proceeded to punch a hole in the wall of a suite at the Beverly Hills Hotel during a group meeting with Kirshner and Colgems lawyer Herb Moelis, declaring to the latter: "That could have been your face!". This outburst came after Moelis snapped to Nesmith, "You'd better read your contract", when Nesmith threatened to quit. Kirshner was later dropped from the project altogether.

Artwork
The original pressing catalog number is COM/COS 102. When the album was reissued in 1968 the Colgems symbol replaced the word "Colgems" on the bottom right-hand corner of the reverse side (Catalog number COS 102 RE). It was standard practice for RCA to add an "RE" when any one side of a record sleeve had a revision.

Track listing

Original 1967 Colgems vinyl issue

1994 Rhino CD reissue
Tracks 1–12: Original album in stereo

"Don't Listen to Linda" (First Recorded Version) (Boyce, Hart) – 2:28
"I'll Spend My Life with You" (First Recorded Version) (Boyce, Hart) – 2:30
"I Don't Think You Know Me" (Second Recorded Version) (Goffin, King) – 2:19
"Look Out (Here Comes Tomorrow)" (Extended Mix) (Diamond) – 2:53
"I'm a Believer" (Early Version) (Diamond) – 2:53

1996 Sundazed vinyl reissue
Bonus track at the end of Side 1: "I Don't Think You Know Me" (Prev. unissued mix) – 2:19
Bonus track at the end of Side 2: "Don't Listen to Linda" (Prev. unissued version) – 2:28, "I'll Spend My Life with You" (Alt. version) – 2:30

2006 Rhino Deluxe CD reissue
The following tracks were included on the 2006 deluxe edition of the album. Some were previously unreleased, while others were on the 1994 Rhino reissue or the Missing Links series. Studio chatter is included between some bonus tracks.

Disc one

Tracks 1–12: Original album in stereo

"Apples, Peaches, Bananas and Pears" (Boyce, Hart) – 02:18
"Ladies Aid Society" (Original Mono Mix) (Boyce, Hart) – 3:27
"I'll Spend My Life with You" (First Recorded Version) (Boyce, Hart) – 2:28
"I Don't Think You Know Me" (Second Recorded Version) (Goffin, King) – 2:20
"Through the Looking Glass" (First Recorded Version) (Boyce, Hart, Red Baldwin) – 2:31
"Don't Listen to Linda" (First Recorded Version) (Boyce, Hart) – 2:28
"Kicking Stones (Teeny Tiny Gnome)" (Lynn Castle, Wayne Erwin) – 2:32
"Look Out (Here Comes Tomorrow)" (With Peter's Narration) (Diamond) – 3:08
"I'm a Believer" (Early Version - Alternate Mix) (Diamond) – 2:51
"Mr. Webster" (First Recorded Version) (Boyce, Hart) – 2:47

Disc two

Tracks 1–12: Original album in mono

"Valleri" (First Recorded Version) (Boyce, Hart) – 2:30
"Words" (First Recorded Version) (Boyce, Hart) – 2:58
"Look Out (Here Comes Tomorrow)" (TV Version) (Diamond) – 2:50
"I'll Be Back Up on My Feet" (First Recorded Version) (Linzer, Randell) – 2:37
"Tear Drop City" (Early Mix) (Boyce, Hart) – 2:18
"Of You" (Mono Mix) (Bill Chadwick, John Chadwick) – 2:01
"Hold On Girl" (First Recorded Version) (Keller, Raleigh, Carr) – 2:44
"(I Prithee) Do Not Ask for Love" (Michael Martin Murphey) – 2:59

2017 Rhino Super Deluxe CD reissue

Disc one

Tracks 1–12: Original album in mono
Tracks 13–24: Original album in stereo

"I'll Be Back Up on My Feet" (First Recorded Version) (Linzer, Randell) – 2:37
"Of You" (Mono Mix) (Bill Chadwick, John Chadwick) – 2:01
"I Don't Think You Know Me" (Second Recorded Version - Mono Mix) (Goffin, King) – 2:19
"Words" (First Recorded Version - Mono Mix) (Boyce, Hart) – 2:58
"Look Out (Here Comes Tomorrow)" (Mono TV Mix) (Diamond) – 2:50
"Tear Drop City" (1966 Mono Mix) (Boyce, Hart) – 2:18
"Sometime in the Morning" (Alternate Mono Mix) (Goffin, King) - 2:32
"Valleri" (First Recorded Version - Mono TV Mix) (Boyce, Hart) – 2:30

Disc two: Sessions
"Whatever's Right" (Backing Track) – 2:32
"Valleri" (First Recorded Version - Backing Track - Takes 1 & 2) – 3:02
"(Theme From) The Monkees" (Second Version - Backing Track - Take 1) – 1:06
"Words" (First Recorded Version - Mono TV Mix) – 2:49
"She" (Mono TV Mix) – 2:36
"I Love You Really" (Version One) – 0:13
"I Love You Really" (Version Three) – 0:13
"I Love You Really" (Version Two) – 0:12
"Ladies Aid Society" (Backing Track - Part One - Take 22) – 2:40
"Ladies Aid Society" (Backing Track - Part Two - Take 1) – 1:19
"Ladies Aid Society" (Original Mono Mix) – 3:25
"Kicking Stones" (Backing Track - Take 11) – 2:57
"Kicking Stones" (Original Mono Mix) – 2:21
"I Don't Think You Know Me" (First Recorded Version - Mike's Vocal - 2017 Stereo Remix) – 2:21
"Mr. Webster" (First Recorded Version - 2017 Stereo Remix) – 2:52
"Hold On Girl" (First Recorded Version - 2017 Stereo Remix) – 2:46
"Through the Looking Glass" (First Recorded Version - 2017 Stereo Remix) – 2:34
"Different Drum" (TV Version) – 0:39
"Undecided" – 0:30
"Sometime in the Morning" (Backing Track - Take 1) – 2:43
"Sometime in the Morning" (2017 Stereo Remix) – 2:30
"I Don't Think You Know Me" (Second Recorded Version - Backing Track - Take 4) – 2:22
"I Don't Think You Know Me" (Second Recorded Version - 2017 Stereo Mix) – 2:24
"Your Auntie Grizelda" (Session Excerpt) – 0:54
"Your Auntie Grizelda" (Mono TV Mix) – 2:37
"Hold On Girl" (Second Recorded Version - Alternate Backing Track) – 2:44
"Hold On Girl" (Second Recorded Version - 2017 Stereo Remix) – 2:34
"I'm a Believer" (Backing Track - Take 4) – 3:17
"I'm a Believer" (Alternate Vocal Take - 2017 Stereo Remix) – 2:41
"Look Out (Here Comes Tomorrow)" (Backing Track - Take 3) – 2:10
"Look Out (Here Comes Tomorrow)" (Unedited Version - 2017 Stereo Remix) – 2:55
"Mary, Mary" (Vocal Overdub Session) – 11:04

Disc three: Sessions, Rarities & Live
"(I Prithee) Do Not Ask for Love" (First Recorded Version - 2017 Stereo Remix) – 3:18
"Tear Drop City" (Original Speed - 2017 Stereo Remix) – 2:22
"Looking for the Good Times" (Backing Track with Backing Vocals) – 2:04
"I'll Spend My Life With You" (First Recorded Version - 2017 Stereo Remix) – 2:32
"Apples, Peaches, Bananas and Pears" (2017 Stereo Remix) – 2:18
"Don't Listen to Linda" (First Recorded Version - 2017 Stereo Remix) – 2:29
"I Never Thought It Peculiar" (Mono TV Mix) – 2:13
"Laugh" (Mono TV Mix) – 2:33
"The Day We Fall in Love" (2017 Stereo Remix) – 2:30
"The Girl I Left Behind Me" (First Recorded Version - Backing Track) – 2:34
"Mary, Mary" (2017 Stereo Remix) – 2:20
"Valleri" (First Recorded Version - 2017 Stereo Remix) – 2:38
"Words" (First Recorded Version - 2017 Stereo Remix) – 2:52
"Your Auntie Grizelda" (2017 Stereo Remix) – 2:36
"Look Out (Here Comes Tomorrow)" (With Peter's Narration - 2017 Stereo Remix) – 2:50
"I Never Thought It Peculiar" (2017 Stereo Remix) – 2:27
"Laugh" (2017 Stereo Remix) – 2:46
"She's So Far Out, She's In" (Live in Arizona, 1967) – 2:44
"You Just May Be the One" (Live in Arizona, 1967) – 2:06
"I Wanna Be Free" (Live in Arizona, 1967) – 2:54
"Sweet Young Thing" (Live in Arizona, 1967) – 2:25
"Papa Gene's Blues" (Live in Arizona, 1967) – 2:14
"I Can't Get Her Off of My Mind" (Live in Arizona, 1967)	– 3:00
"Cripple Creek" (Live in Arizona, 1967) – 3:08
"You Can't Judge a Book by the Cover" (Live in Arizona, 1967) – 4:25
"Gonna Build a Mountain" (Live in Arizona, 1967) – 3:17
"I Got a Woman" (Live in Arizona, 1967) – 6:27

Bonus 7-inch
A: "I'm a Believer" (2017 Remix)
B: "(I'm Not Your) Steppin' Stone" (Vocals Only Mix)

Session information

"She"
Written by Tommy Boyce and Bobby Hart
Lead vocal: Micky Dolenz
Backing vocals: Micky Dolenz, Davy Jones, Peter Tork, Tommy Boyce, Wayne Erwin, Bobby Hart, Ron Hicklin
Guitar: Wayne Erwin, Gerry McGee, Louie Shelton
Organ: Bobby Hart
Bass: Larry Taylor
Drums: Billy Lewis
Percussion: Norm Jefferies, Unknown
Recorded at RCA Victor Studio A, Hollywood, August 15, 1966
Produced by Tommy Boyce and Bobby Hart
Covered by The Dickies in 1978 on their debut LP The Incredible Shrinking Dickies.
A single for Del Shannon in 1965. While Tommy Boyce and Bobby Hart are the writers of the song, several sources claim Jeff Barry, Angelo Badalamenti and Marianne Faithfull to have co-written the track, which is incorrect. Badalamenti and Faithfull did not begin collaborating until the mid-1990s, when they wrote a completely different song called "She". Jeff Barry's work with the band on this and later albums is well-documented (including writing the song "She Hangs Out"').

"When Love Comes Knockin' (at Your Door)"
Written by Neil Sedaka and Carole Bayer Sager
Lead vocal (double tracked): Davy Jones
Guitar: Al Gafa, Willard Suyker, Donald Thomas
Piano: Neil Sedaka
Bass: Russ Savakus
Drums: Herbie Lovelle
Percussion: Unknown
Recorded at RCA Victor Studios, Hollywood, November 23, 1966
Produced by Neil Sedaka and Carole Bayer Sager
Engineered by Ernie Olerich
Listed as appearing on the episode "The Monkees at the Movies" according to the TV Guide, but "A Little Bit Me, A Little Bit You" was featured instead.

"Mary, Mary"
Credits for "Mary, Mary" also available from the AFM contract.
Written by Michael Nesmith
Voices: Micky Dolenz
Guitar: Peter Tork, James Burton
Piano: Michael Cohen, Larry Knechtel
Bass: Bob West
Drums: Hal Blaine 
Percussion: Gary Coleman, Jim Gordon
Recorded at Western Recorders, Hollywood, July 25, 1966
Arrangement: Don Peake
Produced by Michael Nesmith
The 1987 Arista CD version features the extended stereo mix, which also appears on the More Greatest Hits CD.
"Mary Mary" appeared on the Paul Butterfield Band's East-West release a year before the Monkees' version was released
Despite being the songwriter and producer of the track, as well as being a member of the group, Michael Nesmith did not contribute vocally or musically to this track; this happened frequently during the recording of the Monkees' first two albums.
The song was covered by Run-DMC in 1988

"Hold on Girl"
Written by Jack Keller, Ben Raleigh and Billy Carr
Lead vocal: Davy Jones
Backing vocals: Micky Dolenz
Other personnel unknown
Produced by Jeff Barry and Jack Keller
Recorded at RCA Victor Studios, Hollywood, September 10, 1966, and American Studios, Studio City, October 23, 1966
Early version can be found on Missing Links Volume Two (1990)

"Your Auntie Grizelda"
Written by Jack Keller and Diane Hildebrand
Lead vocal: Peter Tork
Other personnel unknown
Produced by Jeff Barry and Jack Keller
Engineered by Richard Podolor
Recorded at American Studios, Studio City, October 23, 1966

"(I'm Not Your) Steppin' Stone"
Written by Tommy Boyce and Bobby Hart
Lead vocal: Micky Dolenz
Backing vocals: Tommy Boyce
Guitar: Wayne Erwin, Gerry McGee, Louis Shelton
Organ: Bobby Hart
Bass: Larry Taylor
Drums: Billy Lewis
Percussion: Henry Lewy
Produced and Arranged by Tommy Boyce and Bobby Hart
Recorded at Western Recorders, Studio #1, Hollywood, July 26, 1966
Appeared on the flip side of "I'm a Believer"
Reached No. 20 on the pop charts, making it the first Monkees b-side to chart
The original mono and stereo mixes differ slightly. On the stereo mix, Micky's vocal is dubbed in at the end of the instrumental bridge just before the second verse; this vocal bridge does not appear on the mono mix. During the fade, Micky's repeated, "Not your steppin' stone" begins sooner on the stereo mix than on the mono mix. The mono single fades out earlier than the track from the mono album, despite both mixes listed with a running time of 2:25.

"Look Out (Here Comes Tomorrow)"
Written by Neil Diamond
Lead vocal: Davy Jones
Backing vocals: Davy Jones, Micky Dolenz, Peter Tork
Acoustic guitar: Neil Diamond
Drums: Buddy Saltzman
Organ: Maurgan Cheff
Percussion: Kauren Seguer
Other personnel unknown
Produced by Jeff Barry
Recorded in New York City, October 15 and 23, 1966 (studio unknown)
First of two Neil Diamond songs performed by The Monkees on this album

"The Kind of Girl I Could Love"
Written by Michael Nesmith and Roger Atkins
Lead vocal: Michael Nesmith
Backing vocals: Michael Nesmith, Micky Dolenz, Davy Jones, Peter Tork
Guitar: James Burton, Glen Campbell,
Bass: Larry Knetchtel
Drums: Hal Blaine 
Percussion: Gary Coleman, Jim Gordon
Steel Guitar: Michael Nesmith 
Arrangement: Don Peake
Produced by Michael Nesmith
Recorded at RCA Victor Studios, Hollywood, June 25, 1966 (7:30 PM – 12:15 AM)

"The Day We Fall in Love"
Written by Sandy Linzer and Denny Randell
Lead vocal: Davy Jones
Guitar: Al Casey
Harpsichord and organ: Don Randi, Michel Rubini
Bass: Carol Kaye
Drums: Hal Blaine
Percussion: Frank Capp, Julius Wechter
Violin: Louis Haber, Irving Spice, Lousi Stone
Viola: David Sackson, Murray Sandry
Cello: Seymour Barab
Conductor: Arthur Butler
Arranged and produced by Jeff Barry
Engineered by Ray Hall
Recorded at RCA Victor Studios Hollywood, October 28, 1966, and RCA Victor Studio B, New York, November 23, 1966

"Sometime in the Morning"
Written by Gerry Goffin and Carole King
Lead vocal: Micky Dolenz
Backing vocals: Micky Dolenz and Carole King
Other personnel unknown
Produced by Gerry Goffin, Carole King and Jeff Barry
Recorded at New York City, October 13 and 25, 1966 (studio unknown)

"Laugh"
Written by Hank Medress, Phil Margo, Mitchell Margo and Jay Siegal
Lead vocal: Davy Jones
Backing vocals: Davy Jones and Jeff Barry
Guitar: Al Casey and Carol Kaye 
Organ: Don Randi
Harpsichord: Michel Rubini
Bass: Ray Pohlman
Drums: Hal Blaine
Percussion: Frank Capp, Julius Wechter
Produced and Arranged by Jeff Barry
Recorded at RCA Victor Studios, Hollywood, October 28, 1966

"I'm a Believer"
Written by Neil Diamond
Lead vocal: Micky Dolenz
Backing vocals: Micky Dolenz, Davy Jones and Peter Tork
Electric guitars: Al Gorgoni, Sal DiTroia
Acoustic guitar: Neil Diamond
Organ: Stan Free
Electric piano: George Butcher
Tambourine: George Devens
Bass: Russ Savakus 
Drums: Buddy Saltzman
Produced by Jeff Barry
Arranged by Artie Butler
Recorded in New York City, October 15 and 23, 1966
Reached No. 1 on the pop charts

1994 bonus tracks
"Don't Listen to Linda" (First Recorded Version)
Written by Tommy Boyce and Bobby Hart
Lead vocal: Davy Jones
Backing vocals: Tommy Boyce, Bobby Hart, Ron Hicklin
Guitar: Wayne Erwin, Gerry McGee, Louie Shelton
Acoustic Guitar: Tommy Boyce
Bass: Larry Taylor
Drums: Billy Lewis
Percussion: Gene Estes
Saxophone: Jim Seals
Recorded at RCA Victor Studios, Hollywood, October 28, 1966
Intended for More of the Monkees, then put aside and re-recorded for The Birds, The Bees, & The Monkees (1968), but unissued until Instant Replay (1969).
Produced by Tommy Boyce and Bobby Hart

"I'll Spend My Life with You" (First Recorded Version)
Written by Tommy Boyce and Bobby Hart
Lead vocal: Micky Dolenz
Harmony vocal by Ron Hicklin
Backing vocals: Tommy Boyce, Bobby Hart, Ron Hicklin
Guitar: Wayne Erwin, Gerry McGee, Louie Shelton 
Acoustic Guitar: Tommy Boyce
Bass: Larry Taylor 
Drums: Billy Lewis 
Percussion: Gene Estes, David Walters 
Recorded at RCA Studios, Hollywood, October 26, 1966 
Produced by Tommy Boyce and Bobby Hart
Re-recorded for Headquarters (1967)

"I Don't Think You Know Me" (Second Recorded Version)
Written by Gerry Goffin and Carole King
Lead vocal: Peter Tork
Backing vocals: Peter Tork, Micky Dolenz, Davy Jones
Other personnel unknown
Intended for use for the television series, but never broadcast
Produced by Jeff Barry, Gerry Goffin and Carole King
Recorded at New York City, October 13, 1966 (studio unknown)

"Look Out (Here Comes Tomorrow)" (Extended Mix)
Includes an organ solo
Used in the episode "Monkees in Manhattan"
Produced by Jeff Barry

"I'm a Believer" (Early Version)
Take 4A, which is slightly slower and features raw vocals from Micky
Produced by Jeff Barry

2006 bonus tracks
"Apples, Peaches, Bananas and Pears"
Written by Tommy Boyce and Bobby Hart
Lead vocal: Micky Dolenz
Backing vocals: Tommy Boyce, Bobby Hart, Ron Hicklin
Guitar: Wayne Erwin, Gerry McGee, Louie Shelton
Bass: Larry Taylor
Drums: Billy Lewis
Percussion: Gene Estes
Produced by Tommy Boyce and Bobby Hart
Recorded at RCA Victor Studios, Hollywood, October 28, 1966
Originally featured on Missing Links (1987)

"Ladies Aid Society" (Original Mono Mix)
Written by Tommy Boyce and Bobby Hart
Lead vocal: Davy Jones
Backing vocals: Micky Dolenz, Tommy Boyce, Bobby Hart, Wayne Erwin, Ron Hicklin
Guitar: Wayne Erwin, Gerry McGee, Louie Shelton
Bass: Larry Taylor
Drums: Billy Lewis
Percussion: Emil Richards
Piano: Bobby Hart
Trumpet: Steve Huffsteter
Trombone: Gilbert Falco, Dick Hyde
Horn: Bob Jung and Don McGinnis
Produced by Tommy Boyce and Bobby Hart
Recorded at RCA Victor Studio B, Hollywood, August 23, 1966
Previously unissued

"I'll Spend My Life with You" (First Recorded Version)
Written and produced by Tommy Boyce and Bobby Hart
Originally featured on Listen to the Band (1991) and 1994 reissue of More of the Monkees (1991 stereo mix)
Re-recorded for Headquarters

"I Don't Think You Know Me" (Second Recorded Version)
Written by Gerry Goffin and Carole King
Intended for use on the television series' "One Man Shy" episode, but never broadcast
Featured on 1994 reissue
Produced by Jeff Barry, Gerry Goffin and Carole King

"Through the Looking Glass" (First Recorded Version)
Written by Red Baldwin, Tommy Boyce, and Bobby Hart
Lead vocal: Micky Dolenz
Backing vocals: Micky Dolenz, Davy Jones, Tommy Boyce, Bobby Hart, Ron Hicklin 
Guitar: Wayne Erwin, Gerry McGee, Louie Shelton
Acoustic Guitar: Tommy Boyce
Bass: Larry Taylor
Drums: Billy Lewis
Piano: Michel Rubini
Percussion: Alan Estes
Produced by Tommy Boyce and Bobby Hart
Recorded at RCA Victor Studios, Hollywood, September 10, 1966
Originally featured on Missing Links Volume Three (1996)

"Don't Listen to Linda" (First Recorded Version)
Written by Tommy Boyce and Bobby Hart
Originally on 1994 reissue
Produced by Tommy Boyce and Bobby Hart

"Kicking Stones"
Written by Lynn Castle and Wayne Erwin
Lead vocal: Micky Dolenz
Backing vocals: Tommy Boyce, Wayne Erwin, Bobby Hart, Ron Hicklin
Guitar: Wayne Erwin, Gerry McGee, Louie Shelton
Bass: Larry Taylor
Drums: Billy Lewis
Piano: Bobby Hart
Organ: Paul Suter
Trumpet: Steve Huffsteter
Trombone: Gilbert Falco, Dick Hyde
Horn: Bob Jung, Don McGinnis
Flute: Paul Suter
Vibes: Emil Richards
Produced by Tommy Boyce and Bobby Hart
Recorded at RCA Victor Studio B, Hollywood, August 23, 1966
Originally featured on Missing Links under the name "Teeny Tiny Gnome"

"Look Out (Here Comes Tomorrow) (Extended Mix - Alternate)"
Features a narration by Peter Tork. This was intended to give Peter a bigger role in the album. Later included on The Monkees: Original Album Series
Produced by Jeff Barry

"I'm a Believer" (Early Version - Alternate Mix)
Same track from 1994 reissue, but in stereo and different studio chatter.
Produced by Jeff Barry

"Mr. Webster" (First Recorded Version)
Written by Tommy Boyce and Bobby Hart
Lead vocal: Micky Dolenz
Backing vocal: Micky Dolenz
Acoustic Guitar: Wayne Erwin, Gerry McGee, Louie Shelton
Bass: Larry Taylor
Harpsichord: Michel Rubini  
Percussion: Alan Estes
Oboe: Norman Benno
Cello: Maggie Aue
Produced by Tommy Boyce and Bobby Hart
Recorded at RCA Victor Studios, Hollywood, September 10, 1966
Originally featured on Missing Links Volume Two

"Valleri" (First Recorded Version)
Written by Tommy Boyce and Bobby Hart
Lead vocal: Davy Jones
Backing vocals: Micky Dolenz, Tommy Boyce, Wayne Erwin, Bobby Hart, Ron Hicklin
Guitar: Wayne Erwin, Gerry McGee, Louie Shelton
Bass: Larry Taylor
Drums: Billy Lewis
Percussion: Gene Estes
Produced by Tommy Boyce and Bobby Hart
Recorded at RCA Victor Studio A, Hollywood, August 6, 1966
Originally featured on Missing Links Volume Two

"Words" (First Recorded Version)
Written by Tommy Boyce and Bobby Hart
Lead vocals: Micky Dolenz and Peter Tork
Backing vocals: Micky Dolenz, Davy Jones, Peter Tork, Tommy Boyce, Wayne Erwin, Bobby Hart, Ron Hicklin
Guitar: Wayne Erwin, Gerry McGee, Louie Shelton
Bass: Larry Taylor
Drums: Billy Lewis
Percussion: Norm Jeffries
Flute: Ethmer Roten
Produced by Tommy Boyce and Bobby Hart
Recorded in October, 1966
Originally featured on Missing Links Volume Two

"Look Out (Here Comes Tomorrow)" (TV Mix)
Written by Neil Diamond
Same mix on 1994 release
Featured on Music Box (2001), remixed in stereo.
Produced by Jeff Barry

"I'll Be Back Up on My Feet" (First Recorded Version)
Written by Sandy Linzer and Denny Randell
Lead vocal: Micky Dolenz
Backing vocal: Unknown
Guitar: Al Casey, Carol Kaye
Bass: Ray Pohlman
Drums: Hal Blaine
Percussion: Frank Capp, Julius Wechter
Piano: Don Randi, Michel Rubini
Produced by Jeff Barry
Recorded on October 26, 1966
Originally featured on Missing Links Volume Two

"Tear Drop City" (Early Mix)
Written by Tommy Boyce and Bobby Hart
Lead vocal: Micky Dolenz
Backing vocals: Tommy Boyce, Bobby Hart, Ron Hicklin
Guitar: Wayne Erwin, Gerry McGee, Louie Shelton
Bass: Larry Taylor
Drums: Billy Lewis
Percussion: Gene Estes
Produced by Tommy Boyce and Bobby Hart
Recorded at RCA Victor Studios, Hollywood, October 26, 1966
Later sped up (and mixed in stereo) for Instant Replay (1969). Previously unissued.

"Of You" (Mono Mix)
Written by Bill and John Chadwick
Lead vocal: Michael Nesmith
Guitar: Peter Tork, James Burton, Glen Campbell, Al Casey, Mike Deasey
Bass: Bob West
Drums: Hal Blaine
Percussion: Gary Coleman and Jim Gordon
Piano: Michael Cohen and Larry Knechtel
Produced by Michael Nesmith
Recorded at Western Recorders, Hollywood, July 25, 1966
Originally featured on Music Box (2001). A stereo mix with harmony vocals from Micky Dolenz was issued on Missing Links (1987).

"Hold on Girl" (First Recorded Version)
Written by Jack Keller, Ben Raleigh and Billy Carr
Lead vocal: Davy Jones
Backing vocals: Micky Dolenz, Davy Jones, Tommy Boyce, Bobby Hart, Ron Hicklin
Guitar: Wayne Erwin, Gerry McGee, Louie Shelton
Bass: Larry Taylor
Drums: Billy Lewis
Percussion: Alan Estes
Oboe: Norman Benno
Harpsichord: Michel Rubini
Produced by Jeff Barry and Jack Keller
Recorded at RCA Victor Studios, Hollywood, September 10, 1966
Later re-recorded for More of the Monkees
Originally featured on Missing Links Volume Two

"(I Prithee) Do Not Ask for Love (First Recorded Version)"
Written by Michael Martin Murphey
Lead vocal: Micky Dolenz
Guitar: Peter Tork, James Burton, Glen Campbell, Al Casey, Mike Deasey
Bass: Bob West
Drums: Hal Blaine
Percussion: Gary Coleman, Jim Gordon
Piano: Michael Cohen, Larry Knechtel
Produced by Michael Nesmith
Recorded on November 17, 1966
Originally featured on Missing Links Volume 2
Two sessions for Micky's vocals were made. The second (which Micky believed was "terribly out of sync") came in October 1966 and was the basis for the song's 1990 release. A different vocal by Micky was recorded earlier that summer.

Other personnel
Music supervisor: Don Kirshner
Music coordinators: Lester Sill and Emil LaViola

Charts

Album

Singles

Certifications

References

Works cited
More of the Monkees CD liner notes
The Monkees: The Day-By-Day Story of the 60s TV Pop Sensation by Andrew Sandoval

The Monkees albums
1967 albums
Arista Records albums
RCA Victor albums
Rhino Records albums
Sundazed Records albums
Colgems Records albums
Albums arranged by Jeff Barry
Albums arranged by Tommy Boyce
Albums arranged by Bobby Hart
Albums produced by Michael Nesmith
Albums produced by Jeff Barry
Albums produced by Tommy Boyce
Albums produced by Bobby Hart
Albums produced by Neil Sedaka
Albums produced by Carole Bayer Sager
Albums produced by Jack Keller (songwriter)
Albums produced by Gerry Goffin
Albums produced by Carole King
Unauthorized albums